Luke Mbete-Tabu (born 18 September 2003) is an English professional footballer who plays as a defender for Bolton Wanderers, on loan from Manchester City.

Early Life
Luke Mbete was born in Westminster, England to Congolese parents. He has 3 siblings and is a twin. He has a fervent passion for football, and it showed evidently as he partook in football matches during primary school and secondary school. He attended Our Lady of Grace Primary School and St Gregory's Catholic Science College in Harrow, England.

Club career
Born in London, Mbete joined Brentford as a child. When they closed their academy in 2016 he joined Manchester City. In November 2020 he started for the City side that defeated Chelsea in the final of the FA Youth Cup. On 21 September 2021 he made his professional debut when he was named in the starting line up for Manchester City's EFL Cup tie against Wycombe Wanderers.

Mbete was loaned to Huddersfield Town for the 2022–23 season. However, the loan was cut short and on 31 January 2023 he joined Bolton Wanderers on loan for the remainder of the season.

International career
Born in England, Mbete is of Congolese descent. He has represented England at youth level.

On 16 September 2022, Mbete received his first call up to the England U21 squad. He made his debut as a 90th minute substitute for Taylor Harwood-Bellis during the 2-0 win over Italy in Pescara on 22 September 2022.

Career statistics

References

External links
 

2003 births
Living people
Footballers from Greater London
English footballers
England youth international footballers
English sportspeople of Democratic Republic of the Congo descent
Manchester City F.C. players
Huddersfield Town A.F.C. players
Bolton Wanderers F.C. players
Association football defenders
Black British sportspeople